The Standard Cirrus is a Standard-class glider built in Germany by Schempp-Hirth. The Standard Cirrus was produced between 1969 and 1985, when it was replaced by the Discus. Over 800 examples were built, making it one of the most successful early fibreglass glider designs.

Development
The Standard Cirrus was designed by Dipl. Ing. Klaus Holighaus and flew for the first time in February 1969. It is a Standard Class glider with a 15-metre span, and laminar-flow airfoil section designed by Professor Franz Wortmann. The all-moving tailplane, a feature of many designs of that period due to its theoretically higher efficiency, caused less than desirable high-speed stability characteristics, and so modifications were made to the early design. Even so, the glider is still very sensitive in pitch.
The aircraft built before 1972 have a washout of -0.75 degrees. The washout was then increased to -1.5 degrees which improved low-speed performance and response at slow speed.

Improvements were made with the Standard Cirrus 75. These included better air-brakes with an increased frontal area and a safer tailplane attachment system. By April 1977, when production by Schempp-Hirth ended, a total of 700 Standard Cirruses had been built, including 200 built under licence by Grob between 1972 and July 1975. A French firm, Lanaverre Industrie, had also built 38 Standard Cirruses under licence by 1979. VTC of Yugoslavia also licence-built Standard Cirruses, reaching approximately 100 by 1985.

Variants
Baby Cirrus
The Baby Cirrus is similar to a Standard Cirrus 75. The only thing different about them is the fact it had its wing on top of the fuselage mounted on a fiberglass beam of some sort. Only one was made. It was primarily used to try and improve the design of the Standard Cirrus. The original registration was D-3111. It was later converted to a Standard Cirrus 75 and was given a new registration. It is still flying to the day of this edit and is owned by a club in Germany.

Cirrus B
The Cirrus B is based on the Standard Cirrus 75 but with interchangeable wingtips giving a span of either 15m or 16m.

Cirrus K
The two Cirrus K have a reduced span (12.6m), larger ailerons, a cross tail with larger elevator, and a strengthened fuselage which make them suitable for aerobatics. This modification was initiated by Wilhelm Düerkop in the late 1980s. Wolfgang Seitz took part in the 1995 World Glider Aerobatic Championships with a Cirrus K.

G/81
The last Cirrus model was the G/81 built by VTC until 1985. This incorporated a longer fuselage and canopy, and a conventional tailplane and elevator with the wings of the Cirrus 75.

Specifications

See also

References

Citations

Bibliography
 Schempp-Hirth Website
 Coates A.,Janes World Sailplanes and Motor Gliders, Janes,1980, pg. 85
 Simons M, Segelflugzeuge 1965–2000, Eqip, 2004
 Sailplane Directory
 American narrative of World Championships (see 1968).

1960s German sailplanes
Standard Cirrus
T-tail aircraft
Aircraft first flown in 1969